Vehicle registration plates of Korea may refer to:

 Vehicle registration plates of North Korea
 Vehicle registration plates of South Korea